German submarine U-16 was a Type IIB U-boat of Nazi Germany's Kriegsmarine that served during World War II. It was launched on 28 April 1936, under the command of Heinz Beduhn, with a crew of 23. Its last of four commanders was Horst Wellner.

Design
German Type IIB submarines were enlarged versions of the original Type IIs. U-16 had a displacement of  when at the surface and  while submerged. She had two shafts and two  propellers.

U-16 was fitted with three  torpedo tubes at the bow, five torpedoes or up to twelve Type A torpedo mines, and a  anti-aircraft gun. The boat had a complement of twentyfive.

Service history
From 2 September 1939, until 25 October 1939, U-16 took part in the laying of mines in open water in and around the English Channel, to hamper allied shipping. On 28 September 1939, U-16 sank the Swedish 3,378 GRT Nyland. The 57 GRT French Sainte Claire was sunk by one of the mines laid by U-16 on 21 November 1939.

Fate
Trying to avoid the depth charges from both ships, U-16 ran aground on the Goodwin Sands, an area that was notorious for both sides. U-16 was lost with all hands; other U-Boats were subsequently obliged to take the significantly longer route north of Scotland to the Western Approaches and the north Atlantic.

Summary of raiding history

References

Notes

Citations

Bibliography

External links
 
 

German Type II submarines
U-boats commissioned in 1936
U-boats sunk in 1939
World War II submarines of Germany
World War II shipwrecks in the English Channel
1936 ships
Ships built in Kiel
U-boats sunk by British warships
Ships lost with all hands
Maritime incidents in October 1939